Mahārāja (also spelled Maharajah, or Maharaj) is a Sanskrit title for a "great ruler", "great king" or "high king".

A few ruled states informally called empires, including ruler raja Sri Gupta, founder of the ancient Indian Gupta Empire, and Chandragupta Maurya. 'Title inflation' soon led to most being rather mediocre or even petty in real power, which led to compound titles (among other efforts) being used in an attempt to distinguish some among their ranks.

The female equivalent, Maharani (or Maharanee, Mahārājñī, Maharajin), denotes either the wife of a Maharaja (or Maharana etc.) or also, in states where it was customary, a woman ruling without a husband. The widow of a Maharaja is known as a Rajmata, "queen mother". Maharajakumar generally denotes a son of a Maharaja, but more specific titulatures are often used at each court, including Yuvaraja for the heir (the crown prince). The form "Maharaj" (without "-a") indicates a separation of noble and religious offices, although since in Hindi the suffix -a is silent, the two titles are near homophones.

Etymology 

The word Maharaja originates in Sanskrit and is a compound karmadhāraya term from mahānt- "great" and rājan "ruler, king"). It has the Latin cognates magnum "great" and rex "king". Due to Sanskrit's major influence on the vocabulary of most languages in Greater India and Southeast Asia, the term Maharaja is common to many modern Indo-Aryan and Dravidian languages. The Sanskrit title Maharaja was originally used only for rulers who ruled a considerably large region with minor tributary rulers under them. Since medieval times, the title was used by (Hindu) monarchs of lesser states claiming descent from ancient Maharajas.

Indian subcontinent

Maharaja as a ruler's title
On the eve of independence in 1947, British India contained more than 600 princely states, each with its own native ruler, often styled Raja or Rana or Thakur (if the ruler were Hindu) or Nawab (if he were Muslim), with a host of less current titles as well.

The British directly ruled two-thirds of the Indian subcontinent; the rest was under indirect rule by the above-mentioned princes under the considerable influence of British representatives, such as Residents, at their courts.

The word Maharaja may be understood simply to mean "ruler" or "king", in spite of its literal translation as "great king". This was because only a handful of the states were truly powerful and wealthy enough for their rulers to be considered 'great' monarchs; the remaining were minor princely states, sometimes little more than towns or groups of villages. The word, however, can also mean emperor in contemporary Indian usage. 

The title of Maharaja was not as common before the gradual British colonisation of India, upon and after which many Rajas and otherwise styled Hindu rulers were elevated to Maharajas, regardless of the fact that scores of these new Maharajas ruled small states, sometimes for some reason unrelated to the eminence of the state, for example, support to the British in Afghanistan, World War I or World War II. The Maharaja of Punjab in the 19th century was Maharaja Ranjit Singh. He earned this title by keeping the Britishers beyond the Sutlej and even crushed the Afghan Empire. Maharajas in the twentieth century were the Maharaja of Cochin and Maharaja Jagatjit Singh of Kapurthala. Apart from princely states, rulers of some large and extended zamindaris were also awarded the title of Maharaja. The rulers of Jeypore, Darbhanga, Vizianagaram, Parlakhemundi Gidhaur were a few zamindars who were titled Maharaja for their cordiality and contribution to the British Raj.

Variations of this title include the following, each combining Maha- "great" with an alternative form of Raja 'king', so all meaning 'Great King': Maharana (as in Udaipur), Maharawal (as in Dungarpur/Jaisalmer), Maharawat (Pratapgarh), Maharao (as in Kotah, Bundi) and Maharaol (as in Baria).
Maharajah has taken on new spellings due to the time change and migration. It has even been shortened to Mahraj and Maraj but the most common is Maharajah and Maharaj.
Despite its literal meaning, unlike many other titles meaning Great King, neither Maharaja nor Rajadhiraja ('King of Kings'), nor even its equivalent amongst. Maharaja, 'Maharajadhiraja', never reached the standing required for imperial rank, as each was soon the object of title inflation. Instead, the Hindu title which is commonly rendered as Emperor is Samraat or Samraj(a), a personal distinction achieved by a few rulers of ancient dynasties such as the Mauryas and Guptas; the Muslim equivalent of emperor would be Padshah (of Persian origin), notably applied to the Mughal dynasty, the Paramount power until the British established their raj.

Compound and dynastic ruler titles
Dharma-maharaja was the devout title (compare Rajadharma) of the rulers of the Ganga dynasty.

In the Mughal Empire it was quite common to award to various princes (hereditary or not) a series of lofty titles as a matter of protocolary rank. The British would, as paramount power do the same.
Many of these (see also above) elaborate explicitly on the title Maharaja, in the following descending order:
Maharajadhiraja Bahadur (or Maharajadhiraj Bahadur): Great King over Kings, a title of honour, one degree higher than Maharajadhiraja.
Maharajadhiraja (or Maharajadhiraj): Great King over Kings, a title of honour, one degree higher than Sawai Maharaja Bahadur.
Sawai Maharaja Bahadur: a title of honour, one degree higher than Sawai Maharaja. (the term bahadur, originally 'brave' in Persian, was often used for 'one-degree' higher', and 'sawai' is 'one and a quarter higher', i.e. just a step above bahadur)
Sawai Maharaja: a title of honour one degree higher than Maharaja Bahadur; as granted (directly) to the Rajas of Ajaygarh.
Maharaja Bahadur: a title of honour, one degree higher than Maharaja.

 

Furthermore, there were various compound titles simply including other princely styles, such as:
Maharaja Chatrapati in Satara, the paramount state of the Maratha Confederacy
H.H. the Maharaj Rana of Jhalawar
Maharaja-i-Rajgan: great prince amongst princes
Maharaja Sena Sahib Subah of Nagpur, another Maratha state
Maharaj Babu: A Rajput title similar to Maharaja. Used by the ruling Chiefs of Hazari Estate, Dohazari of South Chittagong.
For details concerning various titles containing sahib, see there

Certain Hindu dynasties even came to use a unique style, including a term which as such is not of princely rank, e.g. Maharaja Gaikwar of Baroda, Maharaja Scindia of Gwalior, Maharaja Holkar of Indore, three of the very highest ranking ruling Maratha houses.

Rajmata
At the absence of the king (maharaja), minor heir, less experienced Queen (Maharani); the mother of the king takes charge of the kingdom and acts as an temporary monarch/regent. Until the heir comes to the age or the Queen is ready, the Rajmata (Queen mother) administers the kingdom. She is empowered to issue royal decree (Rajyaadesh/rajya shasan) and she will be the head of the military. Famous examples include Rajmata Shetu Lakshmi Bayi of Travincore dynasty, Gowri lakshmi bayi, Maharaji (later Rajmata) Rudrama devi of Kakatiya dynasty. The Rajmata can overrule the advise of ministerial council, abolish or impose tax, appoint or dismiss people from a post and has unlimited powers at the absence of the king. 
When the king is present, the Rajmata being the mother of the king, are given with certain powers to roles. They often share the burden of the ruling king/queen. Few of the powers they are granted (not limited) with are "powers to summon the king, appoint certain people, issue police orders, religious duties, issue death warrant and other minor powers". Famous Rajmata who functioned with the king is Rajmata Jijabai of vast Maratha empire, accompanying the chakravarti (emperor).

Chakravarti
Chakravarti is a Sanskrit term for "emperor". The meaning of chakravatri is "he, whose wheels of chariot is moving" which symbolizes that the leader who is a war hero, who commands over vast land and sea, the one who rules the people with dedication. In the Mahabharata, the Chakravarti Bharat is known to have ruled the entire sub-continent of India brought golden age to his kingdom. He is called as chakravarti.

Chakravartini
Chakravartini is the female equivalent to the Chakravarti, and hence, is the "Empress". She can either be the wife of the chakravarti or she herself is the ruling monarch. Chakravartini is more famously known as Samrajyani or Samrajyadekshini if she is the ruling monarch.

Yuvaraja
Yuvaraja means the crown prince of the kingdom. He is granted with certain powers and responsibilities so that he can be prepared to take over as the Maharaja.

Yuvarani
Yuvarani is the royal title given to the wife of a crown prince. A yuvarani is trained in religious, administrative and judiciary sections but is also trained to command armies in the absence of the King.

Rajakumara
Rajakumara is a prince who is not going to be the next Maharaja. He is created as royal blood and based on the confort of the King/queen, he is conferred with certain duties.

Rajakumari
Rajakumari is a princess who will not be the next queen . 
Daughter of King

Nobiliary and honorary use
Like Raja and various other titles, Maharaja was repeatedly awarded to notables without a princely state, such as zamindars.
One Raja of Lambagraon, a Jagir (in Himachal Pradesh) who served in the colonial army was granted personally the non-hereditary title of Maharaja of Kangra-Lambagraon and a personal 11-guns salute, so neither honour passed on to his son and heir.
In the major, Muslim realm of Hyderabad and Berar, there was a system of ennobling titles for the Nizam's courtiers, conferring a specific rank without any (e)state of their own, not unlike peerage titles without an actual fief in the UK, the highest titles for Hindu nobles being Maharaja Bahadur and Maharaja, above Vant, Raja Rai-i-Rayan Bahadur, Raja Rai Bahadur, Raja Bahadur, Raja and Rai; for their Muslim counterparts there were alternative titles, the highest being Jah and Umara; e.g. the Diwan (Prime Minister) Maharaja Sir Kishen Pershad, held such a Maharaja-title.

Derived style for princes of the blood
Maharaj Kumar (or Maharajkumar) means son of a Maharaja or Heir-Apparent; the female equivalent is Maharaj Kumari (Maharajkumari): daughter of a Maharaja.

Nepal 

The Gurkha Kings of Nepal (now a republic) used the title of Mahārājādhirāja which was "King among Great Kings", a title of honour, a degree higher than Mahārājā.
Rana Prime ministers of Nepal used the title of Shree Teen Maharaja.

Southeast Asia

Indonesia

When the Indonesian archipelago was still predominantly Hindu-Buddhist (circa 3rd century CE until the 15th century CE), all of the Indianized kingdoms which ruled different areas of the archipelago was ruled by a "Maharaja" or simply referred by the locals as "Raja", such as the first and oldest Hindu kingdom of Indonesia the Kutai Martadipura in eastern Borneo, the Tarumanegara, the Srivijaya, the Majapahit and numerous other kingdoms. Traditional titles remain in use for other members of royalty, such as Pangeran Ratu for the heir and other local-Malay titles such as "Paduka Sri". The title "Maharaja" has been used to refer to kings of ancient Indianized kingdoms, such as Maharaja Mulavarman king of Kutai Martadipura and Maharaja Purnawarman king of Tarumanegara. 

Maharaja was also part of the titles of the nobility in the Sumatran sultanate of Aceh. In the past, the title of Maharaja is given to a leader of the unreigning noble family and the Prime Minister Maharaja Mangkubumi. The last Prime Minister of Aceh who was installed to be the Maharaja Mangkubumi, Habib Abdurrahman el Zahir, who also acted as the foreign affairs minister of Aceh but was deposed and exiled to Jeddah by the colonial Dutch East Indies authorities in October 1878.

Malaysia
In peninsular Malaysia:
 Maharaja was the title of the monarch of the peninsular Malay state of Johor(e) from 1873 to 1885. The Arabic, Muslim title Sultan, often considered of higher rank, was re-adopted later and remains in current usage.
 The title Bendahara Seri Maharaja was used by the ruler of Pahang (1623–1853 in personal union with Johor, eventually becoming a fief of the Bendahara family), till on 6 August 1882 Tuanku Ahmad al-Muadzam Shah ibni al-Marhum Tun Ali adopted the title, Sultan.

In northern Borneo, the title Maharajah of Sabah and Rajah of Gaya and Sandakan was used from 29 December 1877 to 26 August 1881 by Baron von Overbeck (compare White Rajah).

The Englishman Capt. James Brooke was declared as Rajah Brooke by the Sultan of Brunei for his role in pacifying the Sarawak revolt against the Sultan during the Raffles' stint. The word Rajah derived from the word Maharaja. In 1842, the Sultan of Brunei ceded Sarawak to Rajah Brooke who founded the Kingdom of Sarawak and a line of dynastic monarchs known as the White Rajahs.

In contemporary Malay usage, the title Maharaja refers to an emperor, e.g. "Maharaja Jepun" ("Emperor of Japan").

Brunei 
In Seri Malayas of the Srivijaya, under the Srivijaya satellite empire of the Majapahit Empire dominated over the whole Malayas far-reaching the present Philippine Archipelago, Malaysia, Brunei, Indonesia under the Srivijaya Empire of the Majapahit King Maharaja Pamariwasa. The latter's daughter Es-kander was married to an Arab (Zein Ul-Abidin), the third Makdum who promulgated Koranic studies (Madrassahs) and was a Srivijaya ruler in Seri who were a Srivijaya Monarchy. In the 12th century with the fall of the empire, the Seri King being a Muslim established the Sultanate of Brunei in 1363 with the throne name Sultan Mohamad Shah. In 1426, he established the sultanate of sulu as his death was recorded in 1431 Mt. Makatangis Sulu grave and 1432 Brunei grave. Both Sulu and Brunei claim the honor of his grave, while his brother, a Johore (Singapore) Prince Makdum Karim (Sharif Kabungsuwan of Malabang Lanao) the second Makdum after the first one Makdum Tuan Masha'ik. Karim ul-makdum re=enforced Islam, a Srivijaya Johore ruler, later established the Sultanate of Maguindanao-Ranao (Mindanao) after taking the political authority of his father-in-law Tomaoi Aliwya of the Maguiindanao family dynasty. He adapted the title as sultan Aliwya (Sharif Kabungsuwan), the first Maguindanao Sultan. The second and third Makdum's father was Sultan Betatar of Taif Arabia who was the 9th progeny of Hasan, the grandson of prophet Sayyidina Muhammad.

Compound Malay titles 
The word can also be part of titles used by Malay nobility:
Maharaja Lela was the title of the ruler of the State of Naning (founded 1641), until it was annexed by the United Kingdom to Malacca in 1832.
Most famous was Bendahara Seri Maharaja Tun Mutahir of Malacca (executed 1509) and Datuk Maharaja Lela Pandak Lam of Perak (executed 1876).

The palace marshal of the Yang di-Pertuan Agong (head of state) of modern Malaysia is called Datuk Maharaja Lela Penghulu Istana Negara.

Eventually, Maharajah Adinda was also used to refer to a particular lineage within the royal families.

Thailand 

The King of Thailand has been called a "Maharaj".

See also 
Maha Raja Rajya Shri
Uparaja
 Maharajah and the Sepoys
 Raja
 Rani of Jhansi

Sources and references 

Monarchy
Heads of state
Royal titles
Noble titles
Titles in India
Titles of national or ethnic leadership
Indian surnames
Thai names